Alberto Félix Crescenti is an Argentine emergency medical doctor, known for directing the SAME, the Buenos Aires city public emergency medical services system.

He majored from Medicine in 1979 from the University of Buenos Aires. He directed the public EMS system in Buenos Aires between 1992 and 1997, and has been directing it again since 2006.

He was in charge of difficult operations such as the 1994 AMIA bombing, the 2012 Buenos Aires rail disaster, the Castelar 2013 rail disaster, and the 2014 Iron Mountain fire. He was also part of the LAPA Flight 3142 and the República Cromañón nightclub fire rescue operations, despite not being head of SAME at those times.

On August 13, 2020, he was awarded the Outstanding Personality distinction by the Buenos Aires City Legislature.

References 

University of Buenos Aires alumni
20th-century Argentine physicians
21st-century Argentine physicians
Argentine emergency physicians
1953 births
Living people